Pisuquia District is one of twenty-three districts of the province Luya in Peru.

References

Districts of the Luya Province
Districts of the Amazonas Region